Conover's tuco-tuco (Ctenomys conoveri) is a species of rodent in the family Ctenomyidae.
It is found in Argentina, Bolivia, and Paraguay.

References

Tuco-tucos
Mammals described in 1946
Taxonomy articles created by Polbot